Cabeça Dinossauro (Portuguese for Dinosaur Head) is the third studio album by Brazilian rock band Titãs, released on 25 June 1986. It was their first album produced by Liminha, who was the director of WEA at the time of the album's recording, which facilitated the relationship between band and label; and their first gold album, certified as such in December 1986.

Background 
In February 1986, before a show in São Paulo, vocalist Branco Mello told newspaper O Estado de S. Paulo that the then upcoming album would have a "more dry and raw rock" and a "more primitive, more visceral" sound.

Vocalist Arnaldo Antunes and guitarist Tony Bellotto's arrest for drug possession in 1985 (and the former's subsequent three-year house arrest sentence); the "relative failure" of previous album Televisão; and the will by the band to take a heavier direction influenced the music on this album. But they did not suddenly decide to turn punk. The ingredients, according to keyboardist and vocalist Sérgio Britto, were already present in the band. Bellotto says the band already showed signs of this new sound during shows

Besides, then drummer Charles Gavin considered the troubled moments lived both by the band and by Brazil at that time were also influencing factors:

Co-producer Pena Schmidt saw the album as "the moment of truth. Titãs had crisis between surrendering to phonographic perfection or to the rebellious statement. There the result balances track by track."

Besides all that, there was also an intention by the band to reproduce in studio the energy they believe they had live.

Production and concept 
The musical material for the album was ready before the band got into the studio. The first track to be recorded was the single "AA UU". The last one was "O Quê". "O Que" and "Família" were the only songs to have their arrangements significantly changed.

It was recorded and mixed in one month. Its demo was recorded in just two days at a studio in the Pompeia neighborhood of São Paulo. The title Cabeça Dinossauro (Head Dinosaur) refers to the duality between rational (head) and primitive (dinosaur).

The album's front and back covers were taken from sketches by Leonardo da Vinci: "The Expression a howling Man" and "Grotesque Head", respectively. Both acetates were brought straight outta Louvre by a friend of vocalist and keyboardist Sérgio Britto's father. They replaced small reproductions the band had but could not use for the album due to low quality. He would say in 2006 that "the first 30,000 copies of the album were made in a mat and porous paper, much more expensive than the ordinary one. A gesture of generosity by André Midani, then president of Warner, which gave us total support before, during and after the recording sessions, complying with almost every of our requests." It was one of the first Brazilian rock album covers not to feature a picture of the artist.

Song information 
The title track was conceived during a bus trip. Vocalist and saxophonist Paulo Miklos showed his colleagues a tape with folk music by some Xingus. Over that base, Branco Mello improvised the verses "Cabeça dinossauro/Cabeça dinossauro/Cabeça, cabeça, cabeça dinossauro" and soon the lyrics were all done. The percussion was performed by Liminha. After several elaborated attempts, he improvised with the walls, the floor and the pillars of the studio, and the "trance" performance was approved by all.

"Estado Violência", written by Gavin, was initially offered to his previous band Ira!. Reis helped him structure the song, but not as much as to be credited as co-writer. The lyrics, however, just like "Polícia", were also inspired by his two bandmates' arrest, more especifically by the power the government has to "judge what you do at your home, with your body".

The vocals of "A Face do Destruidor" was recorded over the base played backwards. According to Britto, "when we recorded, we had to think that it would be listened to that way".

Some of Bellotto's solos were played with the musician alternating between the guitar pick and a big ring he was using. That way, he could play and simultaneously obtain percussive effects from his instrument.

"Homem Primata" 

"Homem Primata" was released in 1987 as the sixth single by the band and it featured a reworked version of "Polícia" and a dance remix of the same song as B-sides.

Music video 
At first, the music video shows black & white shots of the band walking among a crowd, alternating with images of pre-historical men. Then, in now colorful shots, the band starts tagging a 1950s truck with graffiti (illustrations include the anarchist symbol) before they start performing the song on board of it while someone drives it through the center of São Paulo. This ride is alternated with  images of the band performing inside a cage, with people watching from outside.

Track listing

"Bichos Escrotos" 
The song "Bichos Escrotos" had originally been written in 1982 and was supposed to be part of the band's debut album, but it was censored by the Brazilian military government, and the band was thus unable to release it until Cabeça Dinossauro. Even after the song was finally released, radio airplay was still prohibited, but the radio stations were receiving so many requests that they decided to play the song anyway and face the fines afterwards, because the price was low enough, compared to the profit, to make the disobedience worth it. For the videoclip, the verse "vão se foder" (go fuck yourselves) was replaced with "vocês vão ver" 
(you will (all) see).

During a demo recording session in the early 1980s, songwriters Nando Reis, Britto and Antunes took a break as the other Titãs recorded some instrumentals and hung out around a courtyard. Eventually, Reis spotted a cockroach emerging from the drain and that inspired him and the other two to write a song about it. According to him, the song uses the animals cited in the lyrics (cockroaches, rats and fleas), which are considered marginal animals, as metaphors for Titãs themselves, who would keep themselves away from musical and moral patterns and stereotypes.

In one of the earliest performances of the track, Reis would disguise himself and infiltrate the crowd. Eventually, he would interrupt the show and say that wasn't music; he would then simulate an argument with Antunes and would join the band afterwards to resume the song.

"O Quê" 
"O Quê" was the most demanding track in the album, according to Britto:

In a 2016 interview, coproducer Pena Schmidt considered that "the mantric perfection of 'O Quê' paved the way for some three subsequent releases. From there, they graduated in pop production and engineering, ready to take on their own career."

Release and promotion 
The album was promoted by a domestic tour which, until December 1986, has already taken the group to around 40 places. At that time, it was scheduled to happen until April 1987. The stage scenery involved the use of animal skin.

Accolades, legacy and re-release 
In a 2012 interview, guitarist Tony Bellotto revealed he made a bet with vocalist Branco Mello: he would buy him a bottle of Jack Daniel's in case the album sold over 100,000 copies, since he thought it would be a commercial failure. However, the album sold well, and Tony lost the bet. Until its first anniversary, the album sold 250,000 copies, with a total of 700,000 sold until 2016. When it reached 100,000 copies, the band received its first gold record and the band promoted a show in São Paulo in order to celebrate the milestone.

Cabeça Dinossauro is considered one of the most important Brazilian 1980's rock albums, having been released in the same year as other important efforts such as Dois (Legião Urbana), Vivendo e Não Aprendendo (Ira!), Rádio Pirata ao Vivo (RPM) and Selvagem? (Os Paralamas do Sucesso).

In a 2020 interview, Gavin compared the importance of the album for Titãs to that of A Night at the Opera for Queen. In a 2006 article for the Brazilian Rolling Stone, Britto commented:

In 1997, Bizz magazine elected Cabeça Dinossauro as the best Brazilian pop rock album. In 2007, the Brazilian version of the magazine Rolling Stone elected it as the 19th greatest Brazilian album of all time. In September 2012, it was elected by the audience of Radio Eldorado FM, of Estadao.com e of Caderno C2+Música (both the latter belong to newspaper O Estado de S. Paulo) as the seventh best Brazilian album ever.

In 2012, in order to celebrate the band's 30th anniversary, Cabeça Dinossauro was re-released, fully remastered and with a bonus disc containing the original demos for the songs, plus a previously unreleased track, "Vai pra Rua", an outtake of the album. The band also promoted a tour in which they performed the entire album respecting the original ordering of tracks. One of these performances was recorded and released as Cabeça Dinossauro ao Vivo 2012. Performing the album would help define the sound of the band's then next album, Nheengatu.

In the next year, the remaining members of the band recorded a video for the title song, using images from the movie Vai que Dá Certo. Both the movie and the video feature Brazilian actors and humorists Fábio Porchat, Gregório Duvivier, Bruno Mazzeo, Lúcio Mauro Filho, Danton Mello e Natália Lage.

In 2021, in celebration of its 35th anniversary, the album was re-released for a third time in CD format and containing only its original tracks.

Play and book 
In 2016, celebrating 30 years of the album, a book with tales inspired by the album's tracks and a play inspired by the album were prepared, titled Cada um por si e Deus contra todos (Everyone for itself and God against all) and Cabeça, respectively.

The play, directed by Felipe Vidal, take eight actors to the stage where they perform the entire album. It features "the sign of urgency and its relation with youth" in two different years: 1986 (when the album was released) and 2016 (when the play was presented). Vidal considers that the sign in 1986 "provoked the urgency of living a newly-acquired  liberty, with the end of the dictatorship, today [2016], it fights to guarantee such conquest, in a world scenery troubled by growing conservative forces.

The book was released by publisher Tinta Negra, organized by André Tartarini and includes tales by authors such as Letícia Novaes, Juliana Frank and Renato Lemos, besides an introduction by Bellotto.

Critical reception 

By the time of the album's release, newspaper O Estado de S. Paulo's Alberto Villas stated that the album was "the great surprise of the year. [...] It's a shocking, punk, angry and very curious album. An album of poison-rock, a scream. An album of surprises."

Track listing

Bonus track on 2012 re-issue

Covers
 Brazilian thrash metal band Sepultura made a cover of "Polícia", present on the B-side of their "Territory" single, the digipak and Brazilian pressings of their 1993 album Chaos A.D., and the compilation Blood-Rooted.
 Biquini Cavadão covered "Estado Violência" in their tribute album 80.
 Pagode group Molejo covered the song "Família", adapting it to a samba rhythm.

Personnel
Titãs
 Arnaldo Antunes — vocals
 Branco Mello — vocals
 Paulo Miklos — bass (on "Igreja") and vocals
 Nando Reis — bass and vocals
 Sérgio Britto — keyboard and vocals
 Marcelo Fromer — rhythm guitar, lead guitar (on "Igreja" and "Família")
 Tony Bellotto — lead guitar, rhythm guitar (on "Igreja" and "Família")
 Charles Gavin — drums and percussion

Additional personnel
 Liminha — rhythm guitar (in "Família" and "O Quê"), percussion (in "Cabeça Dinossauro") and Oberheim DMX (in "O Quê")
 Repolho — castanets (in "Homem Primata")

References

1986 albums
Titãs albums
Warner Music Group albums
Albums produced by Liminha
Portuguese-language albums